A list of films produced by the Marathi language film industry based in Maharashtra in the year 1980.

1980 Releases
A list of Marathi films released in 1980.

References

Lists of 1980 films by country or language
1980
1980 in Indian cinema